Hines House or Hines Farm may refer to:

Hines House (Bowling Green, Kentucky), listed on the National Register of Historic Places (NRHP)
Hines Round Barn, Sallisaw, Oklahoma, listed on the NRHP in Sequoyah County, Oklahoma
Pierre Rossiter and Charlotte Hines House, Portland, Oregon, listed on the NRHP in Multnomah County, Oregon
Hines House (Bozeman, Montana), listed on the NRHP in Gallatin County, Montana
Hollingsworth-Hines Farm, Turkey, North Carolina, listed on the NRHP in Sampson County, North Carolina
E. M. Hines House, Waxahachie, Texas, listed on the NRHP in Ellis County, Texas
Hines Mansion, Provo, Utah, listed on the NRHP in Utah County, Utah